The 1985 season in Swedish football, starting January 1985 and ending December 1985:

Honours

Official titles

Competitions

Promotions, relegations and qualifications

Promotions

League transfers

Relegations

International qualifications

Domestic results

Allsvenskan 1985

Allsvenskan play-off 1985 
Semi-finals

Final

Allsvenskan promotion play-off 1985

Division 2 Norra 1985

Division 2 Södra 1985

Division 2 promotion play-off 1985

Svenska Cupen 1984–85 
Final

National team results

Notes

References 
Print

Online

 
Seasons in Swedish football